Jean Pierre Lefebvre (born 17 August 1941) is a Canadian filmmaker. He is widely admired as "the godfather of independent Canadian cinema," particularly among young, independent filmmakers.

Biography
Jean Pierre Lefebvre studied literature at the University of Montréal and taught for two years at the Jesuit-run Loyola College in Montreal (now part of Concordia University). He began writing as a film critic, first for Quartier Latin, then for Séquences and Objectif. He directed his first film, a short drama, then three independent features. He joined the National Film Board of Canada and made two films, including the 1968 feature My Friend Pierrette (Mon amie Pierrette), co-starring Raôul Duguay and produced by Clément Perron. Lefebvre was then asked to head the NFB's French-language fiction studio. He began its Premières Oeuvres series, designed to make low-budget shorts and features. Four features and a number of shorts were produced within a year before the initiative was terminated, and Lefebvre left to form his own production company, Cinak, with his wife and editor, Marguerite Duparc. He writes and produces all his own films.

Lefebvre was one of the first Canadian filmmakers to receive international acclaim for his work; his film Don't Let It Kill You (Il ne faut pas mourir pour ça) (1967) was the first Canadian film to be invited to the Cannes Film Festival. He proved to be successful again at Cannes when he received the International Critics' Prize for Les fleurs sauvages (1982) and his film Le jour S... (1984) was screened in the Un Certain Regard section. His 1973 film The Last Betrothal (Les dernières fiançailles) won the prestigious Prix de l'Organisation catholique internationale du cinéma in 1974.

Il ne faut pas mourir pour ça (1967), Le Vieux pays où Rimbaud est mort (1977), and Aujourd'hui ou jamais (1997) make up his Abel Trilogy; three feature films starring the recurring character of Abel Gagné played by Marcel Sabourin.

In 1991, he was made an Officer of the Order of Canada "for his innovative and high-quality feature films". In 1995 he was awarded the Prix Albert-Tessier. In 2013, Lefebvre received a Governor General's Performing Arts Award.

Filmography

Features
The Revolutionary (Le révolutionnaire) – 1965
Don't Let It Kill You (Il ne faut pas mourir pour ça) – 1967
Patricia and Jean-Baptiste (Patricia et Jean-Baptiste) – 1968
My Friend Pierrette (Mon amie Pierrette) – 1969
Straight to the Heart (Jusqu'au coeur) – 1969
The House of Light (La chambre blanche) – 1969
Q-Bec My Love (Un succès commercial, ou Q-bec My Love) – 1970
Those Damned Savages (Les maudits sauvages) – 1971
My Eye (Mon œil) – 1971
Ultimatum – 1973
The Last Betrothal (Les dernières fiançailles) – 1973
Pigs Are Seldom Clean (On n'engraisse pas les cochons à l'eau claire) – 1973
Confidences of the Night (L'amour blessé) – 1975
The Man from the Movies (Le gars des vues) – 1976
The Old Country Where Rimbaud Died (Le vieux pays où Rimbaud est mort) – 1977
To Be Sixteen (Avoir 16 ans) – 1979
Wild Flowers (Les fleurs sauvages) – 1982
Le jour S... – 1984
The Box of Sun (La boite à soleil) – 1988
The Fabulous Voyage of the Angel (Le fabuleux voyage de l'ange) – 1991
Now or Never (Aujourd'hui ou jamais) – 1998
La Route des cieux - 2010

Other Work
L'homoman (Short film, 1964)
To the Rhythm of My Heart (Au rythme de mon coeur) (Documentary, 1983)
Alfred Laliberté sculpteur (Documentary, 1987)
Ensemble (Video, 1988)
Sentiers secrets (Video, 1988)
Laubach Literacy of Canada: The Changing Workplace (Documentary short, 1989)
Atelier altitude (Short film, 1993)
Il était une fois Sabrina et Manu (Short film, 1994)
L'Âge des images (Series of 5 videos, 1994–1995)
H comme hasard (Short film, 1999) (Part of the collective anthology project Un abécédaire)
See You in Toronto (Short film, 2000)
Le manuscript érotique (TV movie, 2002)
Mon ami Michel (documentary, 2004)

References

External links
 

1941 births
Living people
Canadian film editors
Film producers from Quebec
Canadian screenwriters in French
Canadian male television actors
Canadian male film actors
Officers of the Order of Canada
Film directors from Montreal
French Quebecers
Male actors from Montreal
Writers from Montreal
National Film Board of Canada people
Governor General's Performing Arts Award winners
Prix Albert-Tessier winners